Liliane Dardot (born 1946) is a Brazilian artist, graphic designer, teacher, and political activist. She actively participated in the Oficina Guaianases de Gravura, an important art movement in Brazil. She is mostly known for her drawings in colored pencils, her works of lithography, and book illustrations.

Biography 
Liliane Dardot was born in Belo Horizonte, Brazil in 1946. As a young adult, along with studying art, she was involved in social and somewhat political projects, which concerned the impact on poor adolescents of the military dictatorship. Dardot attended school at the Escola de Belas Artes, Universidade Federal de Minas Gerais in Belo Horizonte, Brazil and graduated in 1968. Shortly following her graduation, she decided to teach drawing at the same school. She was a highly skilled student and professor, where teachers spoke highly of her. Dardot later taught at other universities, bringing her fundamental skills of drawing with her. After graduating in 1968, she began teaching art, more specifically, drawing. In 1977, she moved to Olinda, to continue doing art. Dardot began producing lithography joined the Oficina Guaianases de Gravura art movement. After this, she began a type of realization towards her artworks, in that she explains her images as a way of describing ideas of housewife and motherhood. Dardot started teaching again at the Escola Guignard, where she progressively moved into collaborating with writers, such as Brazilian writer, João Guimarães Rosa, in illustrating pieces according to their work.

Artwork 
 Liliane Dardot- O risco do bordado (The risk of needlework), 1981
 Liliane Dardot- Ritual, 1981

Group exhibitions 
 2015- In Verso, Celma Albuquerque Art Gallery, Belo Horizonte, Brazil.
 2017- Radical Women: Latin American Art, 1960-1985, Hammer Museum in Los Angeles.
 2018- Radical Women: Latin American Art, 1960-1985, Brooklyn Museum of Art.
 2018- In Hollow of the Hours, Roberto Alban Gallery, Ondina, Salvador, Brazil.

Honors and awards 
In the Contemporary Art Magazine with a Focus on the Los Angeles Art Scene.

References 

1946 births
Living people
20th-century Brazilian women artists
21st-century Brazilian women artists
21st-century Brazilian artists